Rattlers is a 1976 horror film starring Sam Chew, Elisabeth Chauvet, Tony Ballen, Dan Priest, Ron Gold, Darwin Joston, and Gary Van Ormand. The film was produced, directed and co-written by John McCauley. Harry Novak, head of Boxoffice International Pictures was the executive producer. The film features an early score by Golden Globe nominated film composer Miles Goodman.

Plot
When two young boys are savagely attacked and killed by a legion of rattlesnakes in a small California desert town, the local sheriff (Tony Ballen) calls upon herpetologist Dr. Tom Parkinson (Sam Chew), a Los Angeles college professor, to discover why the snakes are displaying abnormal aggression and swarming behavior. The sheriff teams Parkinson with war photographer Ann Bradley (Elisabeth Chauvet).

As more people in the desert town are killed by the vicious rattlesnakes, Parkinson's and Bradley's investigation leads them to a nearby army base, where the commanding officer, Colonel Stroud (Dan Priest), seems strangely reluctant to help them. Parkinson and Bradley are, however, assisted by the base's chief medical officer, Captain Delaney (Ron Gold).

Shortly afterward, Palmer (Darwin Joston) and Woodley (Gary Van Ormand), two soldiers on night patrol, stop to change a flat tire on their jeep and are killed by a horde of rattlesnakes. Delaney then summons Parkinson and Bradley back to the base, without Stroud's knowledge, so they can investigate the soldiers' strange deaths.

Eventually, Parkinson discovers that the colonel ordered, and then covered up, the illegal disposal of an experimental nerve gas called "CT3" in one of the local desert caves. The exposure of the snakes to the nerve gas had made them unusually aggressive. When Delaney drunkenly confronts Stroud and threatens to expose his crime, Stroud kills him. Stroud then engages the local sheriff's department in a gun battle and is killed.

Reception

Cinematic Titanic Live
Cinematic Titanic, a "revival" project by several former cast members of Mystery Science Theater 3000 (including series creator Joel Hodgson), chose Rattlers as one of the films for their 2011 Cinematic Titanic Live tour. Their treatment of the film debuted at the Pepito's Parkway Theater in Minneapolis, Minnesota on September 17, 2011.

Sequel
Dustin Ferguson directed a sequel, Rattlers 2, starring Mel Novak, Brinke Stevens, and Dawna Lee Heising. It premiered on After Hours Cinema on WGUD-TV January 8, 2021.

See also
 List of killer snake films

References

External links
 

1976 films
American natural horror films
Films about snakes
Films scored by Miles Goodman
Films set in deserts
1970s English-language films
1970s American films